Lieutenant General Anders Reinhold Lindström (14 January 1955) is a retired Swedish Army officer. His senior commands include the Chief of Home Guard, the Chief of Joint Operations and the Commandant General in Stockholm. He retired from the military in 2011.

Early life
Lindström was born on 14 January 1955 in Borås, Sweden. His father, who came from Ådalen, started as a tailor apprentice and became designer in women's clothing. Lindström's mother came from a free church baptist family. He grew up in Borås, Västerås, Nässjö, and Halmstad and started school one year before his peers. Lindström graduated from Rudbeckianska gymnasiet in Västerås in 1971 and as a youth he became Swedish junior champion in bandy.

Career

Military career
Lindström was commissioned into the Swedish Army in 1976 and he served as an officer in Göta Life Guards (P 1). Lindström also served many years in different positions in Södermanland Regiment (P 10) in Strängnäs. Lindström served in different staff positions before he became deputy brigade commander of the Life Grenadier Brigade (IB 4) in Linköping and then he served as commanding officer of Dalarna Brigade (NB 13) in Falun from 1997 to 1999 and in the staff of Middle Military District (Milo M).

Lindström then served as Deputy Inspector General of the Army from 2000 to 2002 and deputy commanding officer of the Army Tactical Command. He has also served as liaison officer at the United States Central Command in Tampa, Florida from March 2002. On 1 October 2002, Lindström was appointed Chief of Home Guard and was promoted to major general. On 13 December 2007, Lindström was appointed Chief of Joint Operations and head of the Joint Forces Command in the Swedish Armed Forces Headquarters in Stockholm. He was at the same time promoted to lieutenant general.

Business career
On 11 October 2011, Lindström was appointed CEO of AB Storstockholms Lokaltrafik (SL) and Waxholmsbolaget as well as the managing director of the Traffic Board (Trafiknämnden). He took office on 1 January 2012. In June 2014, Lindström was elected chairman of the Swedish Federation for Voluntary Defence Education and Training and he left the same position a year later. In May 2015, Lindström was fined 5,000 Hong Kong dollar by the Tsuen Wan Magistrates' Court in Hong Kong for having stolen a cardholder at Hong Kong International Airport during a business trip. Lindström himself claimed that he accidentally forgot to pay for it. In connection with this, he departed from his service, and resigned the same month as CEO of SL and Waxholmsbolaget. Since June 2015, Lindström works as a Senior Consultant for Count On Business Service AB.

Personal life
Lindström was married to Ann-Christine who died in May 2004. They had one son, Anders Junior. He later married his present wife Katharina and they have three children.

Dates of rank
19?? – Second lieutenant
19?? – Lieutenant
19?? – Captain
19?? – Major
19?? – Lieutenant Colonel
19?? – Colonel
2000 – Brigadier general
2002 – Major general
2007 – Lieutenant general

Awards and decorations

Swedish
   For Zealous and Devoted Service of the Realm
   Home Guard Medal of Merit
   Swedish Women's Voluntary Defence Organization Royal Medal of Merit
   Swedish Armed Forces Conscript Medal
   Swedish Armed Forces International Service Medal
   Association of Home Guard Officers Merit Badge
   Dala Brigade Medal of Merit (Dalabrigadens förtjänstmedalj)
    Home Guard Petri Medal
   Dalarna Regiment and Dalarna Brigade Commemorative Medal in silver (Dalregementets och Dalabrigadens minnesmedalj i silver, DalregbrigSMM)
   Central Military District Commemorative Medal (Mellersta militärdistriktets minnesmedalj, MDMMSM)
   Eastern Army Division Commemorative Medal (Östra arméfördelningens minnesmedalj, ÖFördSMM)
   Järnvägarnas driftvärn Commemorative Medal in silver (Järnvägarnas driftvärns minnesmedalj i silver, JvgDvMSM)
   The Nordic Blue Beret Medal of Merit (Blå barettförtjänstmedaljen, BbarettBM)
etc

Foreign
   Home Guard Badge of Merit (Hjemmevaernets fortjensttegn)
etc

References

Living people
1955 births
Swedish Army lieutenant generals
People from Borås
Swedish chief executives